The Kerala women's football team is an Indian women's football team representing Kerala in the Senior Women's National Football Championship. They have appeared in the Santosh Trophy finals once, and were the runners-up at their maiden attempt at the 2005–06 Senior Women's National Football Championship edition against the reigning champions Manipur at Rourkela.

Honours
 Senior Women's National Football Championship
 Runners-up (1): 2005–06

National Games
 Bronze medal (1): 1999

References

Football in Kerala
Women's football teams in India
Year of establishment missing